The Institute for the Study of Global Antisemitism and Policy (ISGAP) is an American non-partisan organization "committed to fighting antisemitism on the battlefield of ideas."

ISGAP was founded in 2014 by its acting director Charles Asher Small. It was the first academic research center on antisemitism in North America.

In 2006, ISGAP created the Yale Initiative for the Interdisciplinary Study of Antisemitism (YIISA). YIISA, headed by Charles Small, was the first university-based research center with a focus on antisemitism in North America.  It was housed at Yale University's Institution for Social and Policy Studies. YIISA was the fourth center of its kind.  The other three centers are at Tel Aviv University, Hebrew University of Jerusalem and the Technical University of Berlin. 

Professor Elie Wiesel, the Nobel Laurette, was the Honorary President of ISGAP. Professors Alan Dershowitz and Irwin Cotler are the Co-Chairs of the ISGAP Academic Advisory Committee. The organization's chairman is Natan Sharansky.

External links
 
Official Digital Research Center

References

Centers for the study of antisemitism
Research institutes established in 2004
2004 establishments in New York City